Brush cherry is a common name for several plants and may refer to:

Syzygium australe, native to eastern Australia
Syzygium paniculatum, native to New South Wales